In Ohio, State Route 112 may refer to:
Ohio State Route 112 (1923-1927), now part of SR 51 (formerly US 223)
Ohio State Route 112 (1927), now part of SR 104
Ohio State Route 112 (1965-1973), a cancelled freeway in Toledo